Klaudija Savickaitė (born 13 September 1994) is a Lithuanian footballer who plays as a goalkeeper for Italian Serie C club ASD FC Sassari Torres Femminile and the Lithuania women's national team.

References

1994 births
Living people
Women's association football goalkeepers
Lithuanian women's footballers
Lithuania women's international footballers
FK Kauno Žalgiris players
Torres Calcio Femminile players
Lithuanian expatriate footballers
Lithuanian expatriate sportspeople in Italy
Expatriate women's footballers in Italy
Gintra Universitetas players